Anthony Ramon Sealy (born 22 April 1991) is a Caymanian footballer who plays as a goalkeeper for Bodden Town and the Cayman Islands national team.

International career
Sealy made his debut for the Cayman Islands on 28 June 2009 in a friendly against Jamaica. His first competitive appearances came the following year in 2010 Caribbean Cup qualifying, making starts against Saint Martin and Anguilla.

Cricket career
Sealy is also a cricketer, representing the Cayman Islands in the 2014 ICC World Cricket League Division Five tournament. In August 2017, he was named captain of the Cayman Islands for the 2017 ICC World Cricket League Division Five tournament.

In April 2022, he was named in the Cayman Islands' Twenty20 International (T20I) squad for their series against the Bahamas. He made his T20I debut on 13 April 2022, for the Cayman Islands against the Bahamas.

Honours
Bodden Town
Cayman Islands Premier League: 2012–13, 2013–14, 2016–17
Cayman Islands FA Cup: 2012–13, 2016–17

References

External links
 
 

1991 births
Living people
Association football goalkeepers
Caymanian footballers
Caymanian cricketers
Cayman Islands Twenty20 International cricketers
People from Christ Church, Barbados
Bodden Town F.C. players
Cayman Islands Premier League players
Cayman Islands international footballers
Wicket-keepers